VYD may refer to:

Assembly of Vietnamese Youth for Democracy
 VYD, IATA airport code for Vryheid Airport, on List of airports by IATA code: V